Kappa Epsilon Psi Military Sorority, Inc. ( or KEY) is a national, non-collegiate service sorority, considered a professional (military) sorority.

History
Kappa Epsilon Psi was founded on April 4, 2011, in Pembroke Pines, Florida, as an alternative to traditional Greek letter organizations for female service members. KEY is the second Greek-lettered sorority established and incorporated by U.S. Armed Forces women.

Founders and First Initiates
The founders are Moneka Smith (Army Reserves) and Shica Hill (Army National Guard).

The first initiates (National Line Alpha) are Ciera Burts, Ariane Wyatt*, Marga Horn, Kayla Hall, Kesia Loyd-Brown, Jennifer Berry*, and Keondra Harris. (Asterisk indicates individual is no longer affiliated with the organization).

Objectives
Kappa Epsilon Psi has three objectives:

Honor our past female service members - Annually each active chapter will honor a female veteran (over the age of 65). The female service member is inducted as an honorary KEY member and her legacy/military service is documented.

Unite current service members - We aspire to unite female service members of all branches of the U.S. Armed Forces. Membership is open to all female service members who are or have served honorably. Our goal is to have a member or active chapter on every military installation - stateside and abroad.

Mentor future female leadership - Candidates with less than two years of military service are paired with a Big Sister that has more time in service & wisdom to share. Members that are retired from military service are paired with new members who wish to seek similar career paths in the civilian sector.

Local chapters and clusters
 Honolulu, Hawaii
 Hampton Roads, Virginia
 Northern Virginia
 Killeen, Texas
 Fayetteville, North Carolina
 Atlanta, Georgia
 Colorado Springs
 Goldsboro, North Carolina
 Columbia, South Carolina
 El Paso, Texas
 Detroit, Michigan
 Clarksville, Tennessee
 Augusta, Georgia
 Louisville, Kentucky
 Ft. Lee, Virginia
 Jacksonville, Florida
 Tampa, Florida
 San Antonio, Texas
 Houston, Texas
 Montgomery, Alabama
 Crestview, Florida
 Mobile, Alabama
 Dallas, Texas

Affiliations
Kappa Lambda Chi Military Fraternity Inc. - Military and Veterans Fraternity: 2013

References

External links 
 militarysorority.com

Student organizations established in 2011
Professional military fraternities and sororities in the United States
2011 establishments in Florida
Professional Fraternity Association